Carex cusickii is a species of sedge known by the common name Cusick's sedge. It is native to Northwestern North America from British Columbia to California, and in Utah, where it can be found in several types of wet habitat, such as marshes, mountain meadows, and ditches. In its range it is most common in the Cascade Range and areas west.

Description
The Carex cusickii sedge produces clumps of stems up to 1.3 meters tall. It is sometimes dioecious, with male and female flowers occurring on different individuals. The long leaves have sheaths dotted with red and edged at the top with copper. The inflorescence is often separated into distinct bunches of spikelets.

External links
Jepson Manual Treatment - Carex cusickii
USDA Plants Profile
Flora of North America
Carex cusickii - Photo gallery

cusickii
Flora of California
Flora of British Columbia
Flora of the Northwestern United States
Flora of Utah
Plants described in 1915
Flora without expected TNC conservation status